This is a list of nominated candidates for the New Democratic Party in the 40th Canadian federal election, which resulted in a Conservative minority government.

Newfoundland and Labrador – 7 seats

Prince Edward Island – 4 seats

Nova Scotia – 11 seats

New Brunswick – 10 seats

Quebec – 75 seats

Ontario – 106 seats

Manitoba – 14 seats

Saskatchewan – 14 seats

Alberta – 28 seats

British Columbia – 36 seats

Abbotsford
Bonnie Rai

British Columbia Southern Interior
Alex Atamanenko, Incumbent MP.

Burnaby—Douglas
Bill Siksay, Incumbent MP.

Burnaby—New Westminster
Peter Julian, Incumbent MP.

Cariboo—Prince George
Bev Collins

Chilliwack—Fraser Canyon
Helen Kormendy

Delta—Richmond East
Szilvia Barna

Esquimalt—Juan de Fuca
Jennifer Burgis

Fleetwood—Port Kells
Nao Fernando

Ran as an Alberta NDP candidate in the electoral district of Edmonton-Whitemud for the 1989 Alberta general election. He finished in third place out of three candidates losing to Percy Wickman and defeating incumbent Premier Don Getty.

Kamloops—Thompson—Cariboo
Michael Crawford

Kelowna—Lake Country
Tish Lakes

Kootenay—Columbia
Leon Pendleton

Langley
Andrew Claxton

Nanaimo—Alberni
Zeni Maartman

Nanaimo—Cowichan
Jean Crowder, MP.

Newton—North Delta
Teresa Townsley

New Westminster—Coquitlam
Dawn Black, MP.

North Vancouver
Michael Charrois

Okanagan—Coquihalla
Ralph Poynting

Okanagan—Shuswap
Alice Brown

Pitt Meadows—Maple Ridge—Mission
Mike Bocking

Port Moody—Westwood—Port Coquitlam
Zoë Royer

Prince George—Peace River
Betty Bekkering

Richmond
Dale Jackaman

Saanich—Gulf Islands
Julian West (on the ballot, but pulled out)

Skeena—Bulkley Valley
Nathan Cullen, MP

South Surrey—White Rock—Cloverdale
Peter Prontzos

Surrey North
Rachid Arab

Vancouver Centre
Michael Byers

Vancouver East
Libby Davies, MP

Vancouver Island North
Catherine J. Bell

Vancouver Kingsway
 Don Davies

Vancouver Quadra
David R. Caplan

Vancouver South
Ann Chambers

Victoria
Denise Savoie, MP

West Vancouver—Sunshine Coast—Sea to Sky Country
Bill Forst

Yukon – 1 seat

Yukon
Ken Bolton

Northwest Territories – 1 seat

Western Arctic
Dennis Bevington, MP. Nominated January 18, 2007.

Nunavut – 1 seat

Nunavut
Paul Irngaut

See also
Results of the Canadian federal election, 2008
Results by riding for the Canadian federal election, 2008

References

 
Candidates in the 2008 Canadian federal election